Mount Darwin is a prominent nunatak or glacier island, at the head of the Beardmore Glacier, near the edge of the polar plateau and about 5 mi WSW of Mount Bowers, rising to about 2,500 m (8,200 ft). It was discovered and named by the British Antarctic Expedition, 1907–09 and named after Major Leonard Darwin, President of the Royal Geographical Society.

References

Mountains of the Ross Dependency
Dufek Coast